St Antony's College Boat Club is a rowing club for members of St Antony's College, Oxford. It is based on the Isis at Boathouse Island, Christ Church Meadow, Oxford. The club was founded in 1994 and shares a facilities of the boathouse belonging to New College Boat Club and has a strong record in Torpids and Summer Eights

See also
University rowing (UK)
Oxford University Boat Club
Rowing on the River Thames

References

Rowing clubs of the University of Oxford
St Antony's College, Oxford
Rowing clubs in Oxfordshire
Rowing clubs of the River Thames
Sport in Oxford
Rowing clubs in England